Peter Ondrovič (born 28 March 1995) is a Slovak male volleyball player. He is part of the Slovakia men's national volleyball team. He competed at the 2015 European Games in Baku. On club level he plays for TSV Herrsching.

References

External links
Profile at FIVB.org

1995 births
Living people
Slovak men's volleyball players
Volleyball players at the 2015 European Games
European Games competitors for Slovakia
Place of birth missing (living people)
Slovak expatriate sportspeople in Germany
Expatriate volleyball players in Germany